The Prospect Hill Cemetery, located at 3202 Parker Street in the Prospect Hill neighborhood of North Omaha, Nebraska, United States, is believed to be the oldest pioneer cemetery in Omaha. It is between 31st and 33rd Streets and Parker and Grant Streets.

History 
While laying out "Shinn's Addition" northwest of Omaha in 1856, Moses F. Shinn set aside  for a cemetery on land where Native Americans and Mormons had reportedly been buried earlier. The location was reportedly one mile from the Mormon Trail. That year he sold the land to Byron Reed, an early Omaha real estate broker. Jesse Lowe, the first mayor of Omaha, set aside those  of land for burial purposes in 1858. The new cemetery included a variety of lands, including the city original cemeteries called Cedar Hills and Omaha City Cemeteries. Parts of those cemeteries are still in Prospect Hill boundaries.

The cemetery's first official burial was in June 1858. Alonzo F. Salisbury, Omaha pioneer and member of the Nebraska Territorial Legislature, was the first person buried there. Early Omaha real estate agent Byron Reed ran the cemetery early, and sold it with the establishment of the Prospect Hill Cemetery Association in 1858. The site of the Cemetery was further made available after the 1870 trial of Baker v. Morton, in which courts ruled against Omaha's land barons and the city's claim club. The land was enlarged again in 1890, when the Prospect Hill Cemetery Association was founded.

Many of Omaha's early business leaders and politicians are buried in the cemetery. There were approximately 15,000 burials recorded at Prospect Hill, including those of many Omaha pioneers, including influential developers, religious leaders, mayors, judges, and benefactors, for whom Omaha streets, parks and schools were named. The cemetery has many interesting monuments and a special section for soldiers from Fort Omaha, and it also has graves for at least 360 early African American Omahans.

In the 1880s the Forest Lawn Cemetery opened  from Prospect Hill, and eventually Reed sold Prospect Hill to the Forest Lawn Cemetery Association.

Prospect Hill was designated a landmark by the City of Omaha in 1979. There is a chapel constructed of rough brick and accented in stone, and a Tudor-Revival gatehouse located on Parker Street. The cemetery was designated as a local landmark in 1979.

Notable interments 
Many of Omaha's pioneer families are buried at Prospect Hill. Some of the family names include Deuel, Gaylord, Hall, Hanscom, Kennard, Krug, Lake, Lowe, McCague, Metz, Redick, and Reed. There are also many other notable people interred at Prospect Hill. There are also monuments to Spanish–American War veterans and the gravesite of at least one Buffalo Soldier, Sergeant Allen McClare.

See also
 List of cemeteries in Omaha
 Landmarks in Omaha, Nebraska

References

Further reading
 L.Baumann, L. Martin, C., Simpson, S. (199) Omaha's Historic Prospect Hill Cemetery: A History of Prospect Hill Cemetery with Biographical Notes on Over 1400 People Interred Therein. Prospect Hill Cemetery Historical Development Foundation.

External links
 
 
 Photo of the Nebraska State Historical Marker
 Prospect Hill Cemetery – City of Omaha Landmarks Commission

 
Landmarks in North Omaha, Nebraska
Omaha Landmarks
1856 establishments in Nebraska Territory